Ricardo Kaschensky Vilar (born 4 April 1985) is Brazilian footballer who plays for Xylotymbou.

Biography

Coritiba
Born in Curitiba, Vilar started his career at hometown club Coritiba Foot Ball Club. In 2006 season, he was loaned to Portuguesa Santista for 2006 Campeonato Paulista. He then returned to Coritiba and extended his contract to July 2007. He was the fourth keeper for the club at 2006 Campeonato Brasileiro Série B, behind Artur, Kleber and Café. He also played as unused bench in the first few matches in 2007 season, behind Café but ahead Marcelo Bonan. Vilar and Bonan both left the club after Artur was re-signed.

Democrata-GV
Since 1 March 2007, he played for Democrata-GV at Campeonato Mineiro (first half of the year) and left for other clubs in mid of the year. He finished as the losing semi-finalist that lost to the 2007 champion Atlético Mineiro. He was the first choice since round 7, ahead Reinaldo.

In May 2007, he left for Campeonato Brasileiro Série B side CRB, at first as first choice but soon became the fourth keeper behind Veloso, Paulo Musse and Jéferson.

With Democrata, he finished as the 8th place in 2008 season.

In June 2008 he left for Campeonato Brasileiro Série C side Treze.

In January 2009, he left for Democrata's league rival Uberlândia as backup of Paulo César, and after the team avoided from relegation, he was the first choice from round 9 to 11.

In June 2009 he trailed at the Czech club SK Slavia Praha.

In January 2010 he returned to Democrata for the third time. He was on the bench against Atlético Mineiro (later the champion) in the semi-final, as the backup for Bruno Pianissolla. He was the first choice in the group stage.

In August 2010, he left for Mogi Mirim to play at Copa Paulista. He was the understudy for Cleber, ahead Maicon.

He started in round 11, after that match the coach used Daniel as starting keeper. Vilar then returned to play as the starting keeper in round 14.

Career statistics

1 2010 Copa Paulista

References

External links
 
 CBF 
 Futpedia 

Brazilian footballers
Brazilian expatriate footballers
Coritiba Foot Ball Club players
Associação Atlética Portuguesa (Santos) players
Esporte Clube Democrata players
Clube de Regatas Brasil players
Treze Futebol Clube players
Uberlândia Esporte Clube players
Mogi Mirim Esporte Clube players
Agremiação Sportiva Arapiraquense players
J. Malucelli Futebol players
Campinense Clube players
Sport Club São Paulo players
Ipatinga Futebol Clube players
Sociedade Esportiva e Recreativa Caxias do Sul players
Rio Branco Atlético Clube players
Clube Atlético Metropolitano players
Tupi Football Club players
Villa Nova Atlético Clube players
P.O. Xylotymbou players
Association football goalkeepers
Expatriate footballers in the Czech Republic
Footballers from Curitiba
1985 births
Living people
Zwaricz, Edson
Cypriot Second Division players